Carlin on Campus is the 10th album and fourth HBO special by American comedian George Carlin, recorded April 18–19, 1984. The show features mostly new material. The opening features Carlin in Catholic School with a short version of "Class Clown" and animation shorts. The ending features Carlin playing piano to an original song called "Armadillo Blues."

George Carlin's twelfth comedy album was also called Carlin On Campus. It includes new material, non sequiturs and extended sequences of two of his most famous routines, Baseball and Football, and An Incomplete List of Impolite Words. The content of this album is almost 50% different from the similarly titled HBO Special.

Track listing: HBO Special
 Opening
 Prayer
 A Place for My Stuff
 Cartoon: It's No Bullshit
 Little Dogs
 Flamethrowers
 Stuff on Driving
 Cartoon: New News
 Whistling
 Assholes
 Stomach Sounds
 Getting Sick
 Baseball and Football
 Cartoon: Universe of Sports
 Sports Cheer
 Armadillo Blues
 Cartoon: Silent Film Star Death

Track listing: album
All tracks by George Carlin.

Personnel
 Toni Biggs – Production Coordination
 Matt Brady – Assistant Engineer
 George Carlin – Producer
 David Daoud Coleman – Cover Design
 Bob Merritt – Engineer, Editing
 Jim Rasfeld – Design
 Don Worsham – Engineer

See also
On Location (TV series)

References

External links
 George Carlin's Official Website
 

1980s American television specials
1980s in comedy
HBO network specials
Stand-up comedy concert films
George Carlin live albums
Stand-up comedy albums
Spoken word albums by American artists
Live spoken word albums
1984 live albums
1984 television specials
1980s comedy albums